Aled Pugh (born May 1979) is a Welsh actor who has worked extensively in television roles and movies in both Welsh and English medium. He is best known for playing Bobby Gittins in the Sky One series Stella, and Gerwyn Parri in the long-running Welsh soap Pobol y Cwm.

Career

Pugh first came to prominence in 1990, playing school-child Rhys in the Welsh comedy-drama Hapus Dyrfa. He starred in three series on S4C.

In 2005 Pugh played Ryan Davies in a play about the lives of Welsh comedy double act Ryan and Ronnie. He later took the same role in a screen adaptation, with critical acclaim. He was awarded a BAFTA Cymru award in May 2010 for best actor in this role.

Personal life
Pugh was brought up in Tycroes, near Ammanford by his parents Sian and Hywel Pugh. He later attended Ysgol Gyfun Maes yr Yrfa secondary school. The school has since amalgamated with Ysgol y Gwendraeth secondary school to form Ysgol Maes Y Gwendraeth.

Pugh lives in Llangynwyd with his wife Emily whom he married in summer 2014. They have two children; Eila (born August 2012) and Efan (born May 2015).

His brother is Welsh rugby player Dylan Pugh who represented Wales at under-21 level. He has also played for Bath, Neath and London Welsh. He now works within digital media and technology, currently at online music platform Spotify.

Filmography

Film

Television

Awards and nominations

References

External links
 

Living people
Welsh male television actors
1979 births